Mihály Babits (26 November 1883 – 4 August 1941) was a Hungarian poet, writer and translator. His poems are well known for their intense religious themes. His novels such as “The Children of Death” (1927) explore psychological problems.

Biography 
Babits was born in Szekszárd. He studied at the University of Budapest from 1901 to 1905, where he met Dezső Kosztolányi and Gyula Juhász. He worked to become a teacher and taught at schools in Baja (1905–06), Szeged (1906–08), Fogaras (1908–11), Újpest (1911), and Budapest (1912–18).

His reputation for his poems in the literary life started in 1908.

He made a trip to Italy in the same year, which made him interested in Dante; he made several other trips in later years. This experience led him to translate Dante's Divine Comedy (Hell, 1913, Purgatory, 1920, and Paradise, 1923).

Briefly after the Hungarian Revolution of 1919 he became a Professor of Foreign Literature and modern Hungarian literature at the University of Budapest, but was soon removed for his pacifism after the revolutionary government fell.

In 1911, he became a staff writer on the magazine Nyugat.

Babits' 1918 novel The Nightmare (also known as King's Stork) is a science fiction novel about a split personality influenced by Freudian psychology. Elza pilóta, vagy a tökéletes társadalom ("The Pilot Elza, or the Perfect Society") is set in a utopian future.

In 1921 married , who later published poetry under the name  Sophie Török. Two years later he moved to Esztergom. In 1927 he became a member of the "Kisfaludy Társaság" (Kisfaludy Society) and in the same year he was made a trustee of the Baumgarten Prize.

He became the editor-in-chief of Nyugat in 1929 (sharing the role until 1933 with Zsigmond Móricz), a position he held until his death.

In 1937, he was diagnosed as having laryngeal cancer. He died in Budapest in 1941.

Work 
Babits is best known for his lyric poetry, influenced by classical and English forms. He also wrote essays and translated much from English, French, German, Greek, Italian, and Latin. There is a museum in Szekszárd showcasing Mihály Babits's work and life. His brother István Babits occupied the house most of the time, with his two sons: István and Tibor.

 1988: 21 Poems (21 Vers), translated by István Tótfalusi (Maecenas, 1994).

Notes

External links 

 
 
 His poem The Danaids in English

1883 births
1941 deaths
People from Szekszárd
Hungarian male poets
Translators to Hungarian
Members of the Hungarian Academy of Sciences
Hungarian Esperantists
Hungarian science fiction writers
Burials at Kerepesi Cemetery
20th-century Hungarian poets
20th-century translators
20th-century Hungarian male writers
Deaths from laryngeal cancer
Deaths from cancer in Hungary